is a passenger railway station located in  Chūō-ku in the city of Sagamihara, Kanagawa Prefecture, Japan, and is operated by the East Japan Railway Company (JR East).

Lines

Station layout
Sagamihara Station is an elevated station with two opposed side platforms serving two tracks. The station has a "Midori no Madoguchi" staffed ticket office.

Platforms

History

Sagamahara Station was opened on 4 April 1941 as a station on the Japanese Government Railway (JGR). The JGR became the Japanese National Railways (JNR) after World War II. With the privatization of JNR on 1 April 1987, the station came under the operational control of JR East. A new station building was completed in October 1996.

Station numbering was introduced on 20 August 2016 with Sagamihara being assigned station number JH27.

Passenger statistics
In fiscal 2019, the station was used by an average of 29,160 passengers daily (boarding passengers only).

The passenger figures (boarding passengers only) for previous years are as shown below.

Surrounding area
 Sagamihara City Office
 US Army Sagami General Depot

See also
List of railway stations in Japan

References

External links

 Sagamihara Station information (JR East) 

Railway stations in Kanagawa Prefecture
Railway stations in Japan opened in 1941
Railway stations in Sagamihara
Yokohama Line